Leprosy is a disease. Leprosy may also refer to:

 Leprosy (album), an album by the death metal band Death
 Tzaraath, a condition referred to in the Book of Leviticus  translated as "leprosy" in English Bibles

See also
Ieper, the Flemish name for Ypres in Belgium
Leprous, Norwegian progressive metal band